Unto Elo (born November 29, 1944 in Helsinki) is a Finnish sprint canoer who competed in the mid-1970s. He was eliminated in the repechages of the K-4 1000 m event at the 1976 Summer Olympics in Montreal, Quebec, Canada.

References
Sports-Reference.com profile

1944 births
Living people
Sportspeople from Helsinki
Canoeists at the 1976 Summer Olympics
Finnish male canoeists
Olympic canoeists of Finland